Star Fox, known as Starwing in PAL regions, is a rail shooter video game developed by Nintendo and Argonaut Software and published by Nintendo for the Super Nintendo Entertainment System. The first game in the Star Fox series, the story follows Fox McCloud and the rest of the Star Fox team defending their homeworld of Corneria against the invading forces of Andross.

Star Fox was the second 3D Nintendo game after X for the Game Boy in 1992, and the first Nintendo game to use polygonal graphics, achieved with the Super FX graphics chip included in the cartridge. The complex display of three-dimensional models with polygons was uncommon in console  games. 

Star Fox received critical acclaim and is often considered one of the greatest video games of all time. It sold more than 4 million copies and established the Star Fox series as a flagship Nintendo franchise. A sequel, Star Fox 2, was developed, but never released until 2017 for the Super NES Classic Edition. The next-released game in the series, Star Fox 64, was a 1997 reboot for the Nintendo 64.

Nintendo re-released Star Fox worldwide for the first time in September 2017 as part of the Super NES Classic Edition. In September 2019, Star Fox was made available on the Nintendo Switch for subscribers of the Nintendo Switch Online service.

Gameplay

Star Fox is a rail shooter in a third-person and first-person 3D perspective. The player must navigate Fox's spacecraft, an Arwing, through environments while various enemies (spaceships, robots, creatures, etc.) attack them. Along the way, various power-ups are placed in the stage to help the player. The player receives a score at the end of each level based on how many enemies have been destroyed and how well the player has defended their teammates. At the end of each level there is a boss that the player must defeat before progressing to the next level.

Control of the Arwing includes thrusters and retro-rockets on the Arwing allowing the player to temporarily speed up or slow down. These can be used to maneuver around enemy attacks and other obstacles. Damage is incurred incrementally via loss of shield energy before the destruction of the craft. The game also has a small degree of locational damage detection: if the ship's wings clip against obstacles or the ground too much, they will break off, adversely affecting the craft's handling and removing the ability to upgrade weapons.

The difficulty in Star Fox is also set in a unique way. Most scrolling shooters, if they have selectable difficulty levels, allow the player to set the difficulty by choosing an option (e.g. "Easy", "Normal", and "Hard") at the beginning of the game. This option usually affects variables such as the number of lives a player has, the number of enemies encountered in the game, the speed of enemies, and so on. By contrast, at the beginning of Star Fox, the player is given a choice of one of three routes to take through the Lylat system. Each of these routes corresponds with a certain level of difficulty, but each route has its own series of unique levels. This gives Star Fox somewhat more replay value than other scrolling shooters that have a fixed series of levels each time the game is played. The three game paths all contain the planet Corneria (the first level) and Venom (the last level), but they each have different versions depending on the path taken.

In each level, the player is accompanied by three computer-controlled wingmen: Peppy Hare, Slippy Toad and Falco Lombardi. At certain pre-scripted points, one will fly into the player's view, often either chasing an enemy or being chased and asking for assistance. Ignoring a wingman's pleas will result in him taking damage, or even being shot down. They cannot be damaged by the player's own lasers (although they will complain if hit). Regardless of their survival, wingmen are not present during boss battles but rejoin the player before the next stage. A player may choose to help their wingmen when they ask for assistance, as doing so will allow them to engage some of the enemies not destroyed by the player, helping the player to succeed and additionally making it easier to achieve maximum score in a given level. Additional points are also granted at the end of each level depending on the health of each wingman. If a wingman gets shot down, he will not return for the rest of the game.

Plot
This game takes place in a fictional planetary system called the Lylat system, which is inhabited by anthropomorphic animal species such as foxes, frogs, birds, rabbits, and apes. It contains the planets Corneria and Venom, representing good and evil, respectively. Andross, an evil scientist, fled to the planet Venom after being banished from Corneria, and declared war on the latter, unleashing an enormous army to wreak havoc on the Lylat System. General Pepper, the commanding officer of Corneria's defense force, dispatches a prototype high-performance fighter aircraft called the "Arwing". However, lacking in time to train pilots for the new aircraft, he summons the elite mercenary team Star Fox to defeat Andross. Fox McCloud, the leader of the team, is accompanied by his teammates, Falco Lombardi, Peppy Hare, and Slippy Toad.

Development and release

Nintendo worked closely with Argonaut Software during the early years of the NES and Super NES. They developed a prototype on the NES, initially codenamed "NESGlider", which was inspired by their earlier 8-bit game Starglider, and ported this prototype to the Super NES (the polygonal style used ended up having a strong resemblance to Starglider 2). Programmer Jez San told Nintendo that this was as good as it could get unless they were allowed to design custom hardware to make the Super NES better at processing 3D. Nintendo assented to this, and San hired chip designers to make the Super FX chip, the first 3D graphics accelerator in a consumer product. The Super FX was so much more powerful than the Super NES's standard processor that the development team joked that the Super NES was just a box to hold the chip. Argonaut did much of the base programming for the game's engine, while the character designs and artwork were mainly done in-house by Nintendo. The main game design was done by Shigeru Miyamoto and Katsuya Eguchi. Characters were designed by Takaya Imamura, and music was composed by Hajime Hirasawa. Nintendo suggested the "arcade-style shooting" element of the game and Argonaut brought the idea of using spaceships.

Miyamoto cited the X-Wings from Star Wars were an inspiration for the Arwings. He frequently visited the Fushimi Inari-taisha shrine, about a fifteen-minute walk from the Nintendo corporate headquarters, and the Senbon Torii gates there inspired the idea of gates that the player would need to pilot the ship through.  Miyamoto stated that he wanted the Star Fox series to star animal characters since he was not interested in making a series with conventional science fiction stories with humans, robots, monsters, and superheroes. He decided to use a fox as a main character since it reminded him of Fushimi Inari-taisha. Miyamoto explained that he had always planned to use the English word "fox" instead of the Japanese word . Imamura used Japanese folklore as an inspiration to add a bird and a hare as two other protagonists. He also added a toad; the inspiration came from a staff member of Nintendo EAD who used a toad as his personal mascot. Imamura populated the Cornerian army with dogs and the enemy army with monkeys, and made General Pepper a dog and Andross a monkey, since there is a Japanese expression about fighting like dogs and monkeys. Miyamoto created several puppets and photographed them to use as artwork for the cover of the Star Fox game; Miyamoto was a fan of British puppet dramas, such as Thunderbirds, so he wanted the game cover to feature puppets. The game was released under the title Starwing in Europe due to the similarity of the title Star Fox to the name of the German company StarVox.

In documentary named High Score, Dylan Cuthbert and Giles Goddard discussed how when they moved to Kyoto to work in the Nintendo office, they were put in a room remotely located from the rest of Nintendo because due to the two of them not being full-time Nintendo employees, Nintendo did not want them to have access to confidential and secret projects they were working on at the time. They also discussed how Miyamoto would come visit them frequently, providing advice and feedback in between puffs of a cigarette, as Miyamoto was a notorious chain smoker at the time.

The game debuted at the Consumer Electronics Show (CES) held at Las Vegas in January 1993.

On the weekend of April 30 to May 2, 1993, the "Super Star Fox Weekend Competition" took place at approximately 2,000 retail locations within the United States. Competitors received a limited edition Star Fox pin, and those who accumulated a particularly high score received Star Fox T-shirts as prizes. The competitors who achieved the highest score at their respective locations were entered into a randomized grand prize drawing for a choice between an all-expenses-paid trip for four to a choice of London, Paris, Sydney, or Tokyo, or a lump sum of $15,000. The grand prize was won by Trevor Petersma of Garland, Texas, who opted for the cash prize. In the United Kingdom, the competition was known as the Starwing Challenge and was held in gaming shops across the country on May 29. Nintendo Netherlands held the Starwing competition at various game-selling stores in early 1993; the winner of each day won a large Starwing poster. Annual Starwing competitions were held during the Dutch Nintendo Championships, held in October, from 1993 to 1996. After the original competition, a limited number of the game cartridges created and used for the competition were sold through the Nintendo Power magazine, listed in the Spring 1994 "Super Power Supplies" catalogue that was mailed to subscribers, with an original list price of $45. The cartridges feature a time-limited single-player mode on modified stages, as well as an exclusive bonus level. The altered start-up screen displays "Official Competition Cartridge".

According to Peter Main, Nintendo's vice president of marketing at the time, Star Fox had a marketing budget of $15 million.

Reception

Star Fox was a commercial success upon release. It topped the Japanese Famitsu sales charts from February to March 1993, selling 325,000 units in Japan by December 1993. Nintendo sold more than 1.7 million units in Japan and the United States by the end of March 1993, becoming the fastest-selling video game launch in North America up until then. It also topped the UK sales chart in June 1993. It went on to sell over four million copies worldwide by 1998.

Star Fox received generally positive reviews. It holds an aggregate score of 88% at GameRankings, based on an average of seven reviews. The gameplay was generally praised, with many reviewers comparing it favorably to Space Harrier (1985) and After Burner (1987). It also received a 34 out of 40 from Famitsu magazine, and a 4.125 out of 5 from Nintendo Power Magazine. The game’s groundbreaking use of 3D polygon graphics were universally lauded. Next Gen Magazine pointed out Star Fox as helping pioneer the use of 3D video game graphics. The game has been used as an example of how, even with a fully polygon design, the game was still very similar to older games in that there was a set path to travel through each level.

Entertainment Weekly gave the game an A and wrote that "the first game to incorporate Nintendo's 'Super FX' computer chip, this pseudo-3D space shooter moves so fast that it practically qualifies as virtual reality. Unlike most games of this genre, though, Star Fox (Nintendo of America, for Super NES) shows some heart behind the hardware — rarely have such powerful spacecrafts been piloted by so adorable an array of frogs, birds, and bunnies".

Accolades
Star Fox was awarded Best Shooter of 1993 by Electronic Gaming Monthly. The game took the No. 115 spot on EGMs "The Greatest 200 Videogames of Their Time", and 82nd best game made on a Nintendo System in Nintendo Powers Top 200 Games list. In 1995, Total! rated Star Fox 10th on their Top 100 SNES Games and wrote that because of the Super FX Chip the game's graphics and gameplay are unlike any other SNES shooter. In 2009, Official Nintendo Magazine ranked the game 28th on a list of greatest Nintendo games. In 2018, Complex ranked Star Fox 24th in their "The Best Super Nintendo Games of All Time".

Legacy

Star Fox has become an established Nintendo franchise, with six more installments and numerous appearances by its characters in other media such as the Super Smash Bros. series and Starlink: Battle for Atlas. A direct sequel titled Star Fox 2 was developed for the Super NES but never released, although programmer Dylan Cuthbert says that the game was actually completely finished. Although Star Fox 2 was cancelled, some of the ideas and gameplay were salvaged for 1997's Star Fox 64 (released in Europe under the title Lylat Wars) for the Nintendo 64. Eventually, a handful of beta ROMs of Star Fox 2 at various stages of its development were leaked onto the internet, and a fan-made translation of Star Fox 2 from Japanese to English was released in the form of a patch that could be applied to one of the leaked ROMs. A finalized version of the game, obtained from a complete ROM located in Nintendo's archives, was released on the Super NES Classic Edition in September 2017.

In 2002, Rare's Star Fox Adventures was released for GameCube. It was the first Star Fox game with action-adventure elements. The player acts as Fox McCloud on the world of Sauria, also known as Dinosaur Planet. In 2005, Star Fox: Assault was released for the GameCube, this time developed by Namco and specifically the same core team that handled the Ace Combat series. It incorporates third-person shooter elements into the game with grounded combat. Star Fox Command, developed by Q-Games released for the Nintendo DS in 2006, is the first game in the series on a portable system and the first to feature online multiplayer. It uses many features from the unreleased Star Fox 2, chiefly the real-time map and mission layout. Star Fox Zero, co-developed by Nintendo and PlatinumGames, was released in 2016 and returns to the storyline of the original game and Star Fox 64, while incorporating new elements such as the scrapped Walker transformation from Star Fox 2 and a new Gyrowing vehicle.

During the game's release, Nintendo teamed up with Kellogg's and Nelsonic to develop and release a promotional Star Fox LCD game watch to those who bought a box of corn flakes and sent the order form to Kellogg's to receive the Star Fox game watch for free. In the game watch, there are four levels and the object is to fly towards an attack carrier and destroy it while dodging plasma balls and falling structures. The game watch also includes a pair of earphones and a headphone jack due to the game watch missing a volume control. Nelsonic later released it in stores in a different watch appearance.

References 
Citations

Bibliography

External links

 Official website (Japanese)
 

1993 video games
Argonaut Games games
Nintendo Entertainment Analysis and Development games
Rail shooters
Star Fox video games
Super FX games
Super Nintendo Entertainment System games
Video games developed in Japan
Video games developed in the United Kingdom
Video games about extraterrestrial life
Video games designed by Shigeru Miyamoto
Video games produced by Shigeru Miyamoto
Single-player video games
Nintendo Switch Online games
Video games about animals